The Gilbert House Children's Museum is a private nonprofit 501(c)(3) children's museum within Riverfront Park  located in Salem, Oregon, United States.  Founded in 1989. 

The museum has 16 hands-on S.T.E.A.M. exhibits, a 20,000 ft² Outdoor Discovery Area, field trips, STEM Workshops, membership opportunities, summer camps, and educational programs in the sciences, arts, and humanities.  

This hands-on museum was named in honor of American inventor Alfred Carlton Gilbert and displays several of his inventions, most notably the Erector Set.  In fact, the Museum is home to the world's largest Erector Set tower at 52 feet. Originally home to the National Toy Hall of Fame, the museum sold the Hall of Fame to the Strong - National Museum of Play in 2002.

Besides its interactive exhibits, Gilbert House Children's Museum also provides summer camps, birthday party packages, and outreach programs.

The museum is housed in several historic Victorian buildings, including the Andrew T. Gilbert House, which is listed on the National Register of Historic Places (NRHP), and a 1998 replica of the Wilson-Durbin House, which was also NRHP-listed until it was destroyed by fire in 1990.

Exhibits

 Outdoor Discovery Area, including the Erector Set Tower – A 52 feet high erector set tower; the largest in the world. There are also 3 giant slides and a maze.
 Farm to Table
 All About Me
 The Creative Space
 Gilbert Engineering Studio
 Fortopia
 Tinker Tracks
Vet Clinic
Grandma's Clubhouse
Lights! Camera! Action!
Up, Up and Away
Salem Station
Forest Friends Toddler Room
Main Street
Recollections
Eye Euphoria
A.C. Gilbert's Legacy of Play
Bill's Bubble Factory
Natures Workshop

References

External links 
 Gilbert House Children's Museum homepage
Historic photos of the Gilbert House from the University of Oregon digital archives

Children's museums in Oregon
Museums in Salem, Oregon
Gilbert
Gilbert
Gilbert, Andrew T. House
Association of Science-Technology Centers member institutions